J.N.N Genesis Vidyashram is a CBSE school located in Tiruvallur, Tamil Nadu, India. The school was established in 2012 and is managed by the Alamelu Ammaal Educational Trust.

The Trust also manages J.N.N Institute of Engineering, J.N.N Matriculation & Higher Secondary School, J.N.N Arts & Science Women's College and K.J.N Educational College.

References

Private schools in Tamil Nadu
Education in Tiruvallur district
Educational institutions established in 2012
2012 establishments in Tamil Nadu